Broke is an American television sitcom created by Alex Herschlag that aired on CBS from April 2 to June 25, 2020. The series follows a single mother who takes in her estranged sister and brother-in-law, and their assistant, after the brother-in-law is written out of his trust fund. It stars Jaime Camil, Pauley Perrette, Natasha Leggero, Izzy Diaz, and Antonio Raul Corbo. In May 2020, the series was canceled.

Premise
After a wealthy father cuts off his son financially, the son and daughter-in-law move to Reseda, a neighborhood in Los Angeles, to live in the home of the wife's estranged (and more grounded) sister, a working single mother, and her son.

Cast and characters

Main 

 Jaime Camil as Javier, Elizabeth's spoiled but likeable husband and Jackie's brother-in-law who forms a close bond with his nephew, Sammy. Cut off by his wealthy father, Javier is initially obsessed with trying to regain his trust, but he eventually learns to be patient and make the best of his current situation.
 Pauley Perrette as Jackie Dixon, a confident single mother who works as a bartender to support her son, Sammy, while also trying to start her own business. She takes in her sister and brother-in-law when they need a place to live and begins to repair the poor relationship she has with them.
 Natasha Leggero as Elizabeth, Jackie's estranged sister and Javier's wife. Unlike Javier, she struggles to adjust to living without wealth but slowly comes around to the realization that she and her husband have a valuable opportunity to build their own life.
 Izzy Diaz as Luis Dominguez, Javier's assistant and friend, who resides with the family. He and Javier often converse in Spanish. It's revealed that Luis is still being paid by Javier's father as he is the only person who understands him, the two having been raised together.
 Antonio Raul Corbo as Sammy, Jackie's son with an intensely creative mind. He turns 11 years old in the final episode. Unlike his mother, Sammy is thrilled to have more people in the house, as revealed in his voice-over during the opening title sequence.

Recurring 
 Al Madrigal as Derek, the unpleasant manager at Mitzi's, the bar where Jackie works; he is the son of the bar's owner.
 Fred Stoller as Keith, a regular customer at Mitzi's who frequently hits on Jackie.
 Kyle Bornheimer as Barry, Jackie's ex-husband and Sammy's deadbeat father.

Guest 
 Jack McGee as Ernie, Jackie and Elizabeth's hustler father, currently incarcerated for passing fraudulent checks
 Jordan Harvey as himself, the uncle of a player on Sammy's soccer team
 Elizabeth Ho as Christine, the commissioner of Sammy's soccer league who mistreated Elizabeth when they were kids
 Brandon Kyle Goodman as Luke, Luis' romantic interest
 Natalie Ceballos as Paula, a sales representative for Uncle Juan's Tequila, who sponsors a Cinco de Mayo party at Mitzi's
 Cheech Marin as Don Dominguez, Luis' father who works as Javier's father's assistant
 Phil Buckman as Nick Murray, Jackie's rival contractor, Elizabeth's former boyfriend, and son of Ernie's former business partner
 Christopher Thornton as Max Lefleur

Episodes

Production

Development
On February 22, 2019, it was announced that CBS had given the production a pilot order. The pilot was written by Alex Herschlag who executive produces alongside Jennie Urman Snyder, Camil, Ben Silverman, Joanna Klein, Victor Gonzalez, Gonzalo Cilley, Guillermo Restrepo, and Maria Lucia Hernandez Frieri. Production companies involved with the pilot include Propagate, RCN TV, Resonant TV, Sutton Street Productions and CBS Television Studios. On May 6, 2019, it was announced that the production had been given a series order under the name of Broke. A few days later, it was announced that the series would premiere as a mid-season replacement in the winter-spring of 2020. The series premiered on April 2, 2020. On May 6, 2020, CBS canceled the series after one season; all 13 episodes produced were aired, with the finale airing June 25, 2020.

Casting 
In February 2019, it was announced that Jaime Camil had been cast in the pilot's lead role. Although the pilot was ordered, in March 2019 it was reported that former NCIS star Pauley Perrette and Natasha Leggero had joined the cast. Along with the announcement of the series order, Izzy Diaz and Antonio Corbo were cast as series regulars.

Release

Marketing
On May 15, 2019, CBS released the first official trailer for the series.

Reception

On Rotten Tomatoes, the series holds an approval rating of 60% based on 5 reviews, with an average rating of 4.25/10. On Metacritic, the series has a weighted average score of 38 out of 100, based on 5 critics, indicating "generally unfavorable reviews".

Ratings

References

External links 
 
 

2020s American sitcoms
2020s American LGBT-related comedy television series
2020 American television series debuts
2020 American television series endings
American television series based on Colombian television series
English-language television shows
American LGBT-related sitcoms
Latino sitcoms
Poverty in television
Television series about families
Television series about sisters
Lesbian-related television shows
Spanish-language television programming in the United States
Television shows set in Los Angeles
Television series by CBS Studios
CBS original programming